"The Launch" is a song by Dutch disc jockey DJ Jean, produced by Jean and Klubbheads. The vocals are performed by Natasja Morales. It was released in the Netherlands in 1999 and reached number one on the Dutch Top 40. In the United Kingdom, the song was released on 30 August 1999, peaking at number two on the UK Singles Chart the following month.

Track listing
Dutch CD single
 "The Launch" (radio edit) – 3:38
 "The Launch" (Rollercoaster's Pumped Up Mix) – 6:10

Charts

Weekly charts

Year-end charts

Certifications

Release history

References

1999 singles
1999 songs
Dutch Top 40 number-one singles
AM PM Records singles